Timothy Joseph Gerard O'Gorman (born 15 May 1967) is a former professional cricketer who played first-class cricket for Derbyshire from 1987 to 1996.

O'Gorman was born at Woking, Surrey, into a cricketing family. He was educated at St George's College, Weybridge and St Chad's College, Durham University, where he studied law and became a solicitor.

A right-hand batsman, O'Gorman played 197 innings in 117 first-class matches, scoring 5372 runs at an average of 31.05 and a top score of 148. He was an occasional right-arm off-break bowler who took three first-class wickets at a cost of 215 runs. His grandfather, Joe O'Gorman, also played first-class cricket.

Since retiring from the professional game, O'Gorman has been chairman of the Professional Cricketers' Association, and served as a member of the General and Cricket committees of the MCC and Chairman of the MCC Young Cricketers. He is Company Secretary of The Carphone Warehouse.

References

1967 births
Living people
Alumni of St Chad's College, Durham
Derbyshire cricketers
Sportspeople from Woking
British Universities cricketers